The Elk Mountains are a high, rugged mountain range in the Rocky Mountains of west-central Colorado in the United States. The mountains sit on the western side of the Continental Divide, largely in southern Pitkin and northern Gunnison counties, in the area southwest of Aspen, south of the Roaring Fork River valley, and east of the Crystal River. The range sits west of the Sawatch Range and northeast of the West Elk Mountains. Much of the range is located within the White River National Forest and the Gunnison National Forest, as well as the Maroon Bells-Snowmass Wilderness and Raggeds Wilderness. The Elk Mountains rise nearly 9,000 ft. above the Roaring Fork Valley to the north.

The highest peaks in the range are its fourteeners, Castle Peak (14,265 ft), Maroon Peak (14,156 ft), Capitol Peak (14,130 ft), Snowmass Mountain (14,092 ft), Pyramid Peak (14,018 ft), and North Maroon Peak (14,014 ft). Maroon Peak and North Maroon Peak are collectively known as the Maroon Bells, a popular destination for recreation alpinism. Mount Sopris (12,953 ft) sits at the northwest end of the range and dominates the skyline of the lower Roaring Fork Valley and the town of Carbondale, Colorado, serving as an unofficial symbol of the area. 

Additional notable peaks in the range include:
 Cathedral Peak, 13,943 ft (4,250 m), near Pyramid Peak
 Hagerman Peak, 13,841 ft (4,219 m), near Snowmass Mountain
 Snowmass Peak, 13,620 ft (4,151 m), near Hagerman Peak
 Clark Peak, 13,580 ft (4,139 m), near Capitol Peak
 Treasure Mountain, 13,528 ft (4,123 m), southwest of the Maroon Bells
 Mount Owen, 13,058 ft (3,980 m), high point of the Ruby Range
 Mount Sopris, 12,965 ft (3,952 m), north west of Capitol Peak
 Chair Mountain, 12,721 ft (3,877 m), high point of The Raggeds
 Crested Butte, 12,162 ft (3,706 m), home of Crested Butte Mountain Resort
 Whitehouse Mountain, 11,975 ft (3,650 m), northwest of Treasure Mountain

The range provides a formidable barrier to travel and is traversed only by backroad passes and trails, including Schofield Pass, Pearl Pass, and Taylor Pass. State Highway 133 traverses McClure Pass, at the western end of the range. The range has been the site of mining activity since the days of the Colorado Silver Boom, which saw the founding of mining towns such as Aspen and Ashcroft. In the late 19th century, the western and southern flank of the range became the site of intense coal mining activity which continues to the present day.  Treasure Mountain, overlooking the town of Marble, is home to the famous Yule Marble Quarry.  Quarried marble was used to create The Tomb of the Unknowns, the Lincoln Memorial, Denver Post Office and other buildings. The range receives a great deal of snowfall due to its position to the west of the continental divide and the westerly origin of many winter storms. This is exploited by the ski areas in the vicinity of Aspen, which are located on the flanks of smaller mountains alongside the Roaring Fork Valley.

Prominent peaks

See also

West Elk Mountains

References

External links

 
 Geology of the Elk Mountains

Mountain ranges of Colorado
Ranges of the Rocky Mountains
Roaring Fork Valley
Landforms of Pitkin County, Colorado
Landforms of Gunnison County, Colorado